The women's javelin throw event at the 1993 Summer Universiade was held at the UB Stadium in Buffalo, United States on 16 July 1993.

Results

References

Athletics at the 1993 Summer Universiade
1993 in women's athletics
1993